The Izki Natural Park is in Álava, Basque Country, Spain. The park encompasses the valley of the Izki river, which is mostly covered by Quercus pyrenaica forests. Korres is the only settlement within the park.

Location and weather 
The park limits the  range to the north, the northern branch of the Ega river to the east, the Sierra de Cantabria to the south and Treviño to the west.

Izki is in a transition area between the Atlantic and the Mediterranean climate domains. Despite the geographical barriers encountered by the winds coming from the northwest, the yearly rainfall averages . Winters are cold, with temperatures often dropping below freezing. Summers are warm, with slight droughts that condition the flora of the park.

Fauna 

The park's climate, varied vegetation and isolation allow a rich wildlife based on various raptorial birds such as hawks, booted eagles, short toed snake eagles, Egyptian vultures and a few more. But the true ornithological treasure is the middle peak woodpecker that has its largest population of Spain in this park. There are also river mammals like the otter, the Pyrenean desman, the European mink and the more common forest mammals such as the fox, the wildcat and the beech marten. Among amphibians, the Spanish painted frog, the agile frog and the alpine newt inhabit the park.

Flora 

The forest is built over the silicon substrate based and well-drained sandy substrates in the plains of the valley originated by the Berron and the Izki Rivers. The half-Mediterranean half-Atlantic climate in conjunction with the hard insolation and the atmospheric dryness give these species an ecological edge over beech trees.

There are wide areas of beech forest in the higher zones that take an  area representing 27,45% of the park's forests. It stands on neutral or moderately acidic soils rich in carbonates. There are also some spots of acidophile beeches interspersed in the valley.

Portuguese oaks can be found near the humid sectors around the rivers and acquire their maximum splendor in the limestone areas between the villages of Korres and Bujanda and also around Arlucea. As they are young trees their conservation is precarious. As they need to stand in a fresh ground with a good liquid retention capacity, they usually occupy clayey and marly grounds. Under  the Portuguese oak is substituted by the Mediterranean oaks. Groups of downy oaks, field maples and European hollys can also be found.

It is important to mention the existence of silver birch, English oak and holm oak populations in the valley that while there are not many they are important for remarking the ecologic and landscape interests the park has.

Mountain and trekking 

Due to the natural diversity and the slopes the terrain has the park offers many trekking paths for appreciation of the landscapes.

- The ascension from San Roman to the Muela mountain.
- The ascension from Antoñana to Soila through a forest allows viewing most of the mentioned tree varieties and a couple of especially wide and old lime-trees and yew-trees.
- The cliffs in Korres and Bujanda.
- The ascension from Marquinez to the Belabia mountain and the visit to the artificial caves.
- The tour from Apellaniz to Arlucea passing through the San Justi and the San Cristóbal mountains. 
- The ascension of the Azaceta mountain pass to Kapildui.

References

External links
 
 
 

1998 establishments in the Basque Country (autonomous community)
Natura 2000 in the Basque Country (autonomous community)
Natural parks of Spain
Protected areas established in 1998
Protected areas of the Basque Country (autonomous community)